Henri Joseph Rivière (16 January 1922 – 20 June 1989) was a French bobsledder who competed in the 1950s. At the 1952 Winter Olympics in Oslo, he finished fifth in the two-man and 11th in the four-man events.

References

1952 bobsleigh two-man results
1952 bobsleigh four-man results
Bobsleigh four-man results: 1948-64.

Bobsledders at the 1952 Winter Olympics
French male bobsledders
1989 deaths
1922 births
Sportspeople from Isère